Elections to Purbeck District Council were held on 6 May 1999. The whole council was up for election with boundary changes since the last election in 1998 increasing the number of seats by 2. The Conservative party gained overall control of the council from no overall control.

Election result

References
1999 Purbeck election result

1999
1999 English local elections
20th century in Dorset